Flute Sonata may refer to:

 Flute sonata, a sonata for flute and, usually, piano
 Flute Sonata (Martinů), H. 306, was composed in 1945
 Flute Sonata (Poulenc), FP 164, by Francis Poulenc, for flute and piano, was written in 1957
 Flute Sonata (Prokofiev), Op. 94, composed by Sergei Prokofiev in 1943
 Flute Sonata No. 4 (Ries), Op. 87, is a composition for piano and flute by Ferdinand Ries published in 1819
 Flute Sonata (attrib. Beethoven), is a flute sonata attributed to Ludwig van Beethoven